The canton of Flixecourt is an administrative division of the Somme department, in northern France. It was created at the French canton reorganisation which came into effect in March 2015. Its seat is in Flixecourt.

It consists of the following communes:

Berteaucourt-les-Dames
Bettencourt-Saint-Ouen
Bouchon
Canaples
Condé-Folie
Domart-en-Ponthieu
L'Étoile
Flesselles
Flixecourt
Franqueville
Fransu
Halloy-lès-Pernois
Havernas
Lanches-Saint-Hilaire
Pernois
Ribeaucourt
Saint-Léger-lès-Domart
Saint-Ouen
Saint-Vaast-en-Chaussée
Surcamps
Vauchelles-lès-Domart
Vaux-en-Amiénois
Vignacourt
Ville-le-Marclet

References

Cantons of Somme (department)